The 2014–15 season of the Turkish Women's First Football League is the 19th season of Turkey's premier women's football league. Konak Belediyespor is the champion of the season

Teams

League table

Final
The final was played on 24 April 2015 at the İsmetpaşa Stadium in Kocaeli.

Results

Topscorers

.

References

External links
 Kadınlar 1. Ligi 2014 - 2015 Sezonu 

2014
2014–15 domestic women's association football leagues
Women's